Freya is a mythical Asgardian appearing in American comic books published by Marvel Comics, based on the Norse deity of the same name.
Within the context of the stories, Freya is the Asgardian goddess of fertility. She appears as a supporting character of Thor.

Publication history
Freya first appeared in Thor #321 (Oct. 1993) and was created by Bill Mantlo and Don Heck.

Mythical character biography
Freya is the Goddess of Fertility who used to work as a former Valkyrie. The people of Asgard have started a cult that worships her on the Isle of Love.

On one occasion, Rimthursar lied to Freya stating that Odin has died in order to trick her into crying so that Rimthursar can collect her tears.

Freya had an artifact named after her called the Cloak of Freya which Loki once used to turn Storm into a falcon.

Freya's history was later retconned where she was the daughter of the Giant Thyrm and her position was given to the similarly-names fellow goddess Freyja. Thyrm once tried to get Thor and Loki to give him Mjolnir in exchange for Thor's hand in marriage to Freya. Thor and Loki were able to outwit Thyrm.

Powers and abilities
Freya has the various superhuman attributes that the other Asgardians have. She can also speak in the languages of the Nine Realms.

References

External links
 Freya at Marvel Wiki
 Freya at Marvel Appendix

Marvel Comics Asgardians
Comics characters introduced in 1982
Freyja
Fictional goddesses
Marvel Comics characters with superhuman strength